Chris Knoche (born December 29, 1957) is the former head basketball coach of the American University Eagles men's basketball program. Knoche is currently in his twelfth season as the color analyst for the Maryland Terrapins men's basketball broadcasts. Chris Knoche attended W.T. Woodson in Fairfax, Virginia. He started on the varsity basketball team in his junior and senior seasons.  He played under Coach "Red" Jenkins.

Head coaching record

References

1957 births
Living people
American Eagles men's basketball coaches
American Eagles men's basketball players
American radio sports announcers
American television sports announcers
College men's basketball head coaches in the United States
Maryland Terrapins basketball
Radio personalities from Washington, D.C.
College basketball announcers in the United States
American men's basketball players
Wilbert Tucker Woodson High School alumni